The Arameans Suryoye football team is the representative football team for Arameans worldwide. They are not affiliated with FIFA or Asian Football Confederation, and therefore cannot compete for the FIFA World Cup or Asian Cup. The team played in the 2008 VIVA World Cup reaching the final which they lost 2–0 to Padania.
The team played in the CONIFA World Football Cup 2014 in Östersund, Sweden, and won bronze medal in the game against South Ossetia with 1–4.

Selected internationals

Competitive Record

World Cup

Managers

References

Assyrian football clubs
Asian national and official selection-teams not affiliated to FIFA
CONIFA member associations